Salisbury Center is a hamlet (and census-designated place) located in the Town of Salisbury in Herkimer County, New York, United States. Salisbury Center has a post office with zip code 13454.

New York State Route 29 and New York State Route 29A intersect in the CDP, with NY 29A having its western terminus at the intersection.

References

Hamlets in Herkimer County, New York
Hamlets in New York (state)